"Diggin' a Hole" is a song by Canadian rock band Big Sugar. It was released as the lead single from the band's 1996 album, Hemi-Vision. The song was co-written by Canadian musician Andy Curran and well known Canadian actor and TV host Dan Gallagher. The song was successful in Canada, reaching  9 on the RPM Hit Tracks chart. The song was re-released in 1999 on the U.S. version of Big Sugar's next album, Heated. Between 1995 and 2016, "Diggin' a Hole" was the fifth-most-played song by a Canadian artist on rock radio stations in Canada.

Track listings
UK CD single
 "Diggin' a Hole" (edit) – 3:45
 "Tobacco Hand" (dub) – 4:53
 "Skull Ring" (dub) – 4:54
 "Joe Lewis / Judgement Day" (Moog dub) – 4:06

Australian CD single
 "Diggin' a Hole" (remix/edit) – 3:31
 "Diggin' a Hole" (remix) – 3:53
 "Diggin' a Hole" (album version) – 4:39
 "Joe Lewis / Judgement Day" (Moog dub) – 4:06

Charts

Release history

References

1996 singles
1996 songs
A&M Records singles
Big Sugar songs
Polydor Records singles
Songs written by Gordie Johnson